Lord Currie may refer to:
Philip Currie, 1st Baron Currie
David Currie, Baron Currie of Marylebone